Cheng I-ching (born 15 February 1992) is a Taiwanese table tennis player. She competed at the 2016 Summer Olympics in the women's singles event, in which she was eliminated in the quarterfinals by Li Xiaoxia, and as part of the Chinese Taipei team in the women's team event. Cheng helped Chinese Taipei woman's team win bronze at the World Team Championships and became the first Taiwanese-born medalist at the Woman's World Cup in 2016.

Cheng represented Taiwan in the 2020 Tokyo Olympics in the mixed doubles event alongside Lin Yun-ju, in which they won the bronze medal. She is currently also a master's degree student in the Department of Physical Education of Fu Jen Catholic University.

References

External links
 

1992 births
Living people
Fu Jen Catholic University alumni
Taiwanese female table tennis players
Olympic table tennis players of Taiwan
Table tennis players at the 2016 Summer Olympics
Table tennis players at the 2020 Summer Olympics
Universiade medalists in table tennis
Table tennis players at the 2010 Asian Games
Table tennis players at the 2014 Asian Games
World Table Tennis Championships medalists
Table tennis players at the 2018 Asian Games
Universiade silver medalists for Chinese Taipei
Asian Games competitors for Chinese Taipei
Expatriate table tennis people in Japan
Medalists at the 2013 Summer Universiade
Medalists at the 2015 Summer Universiade
Medalists at the 2017 Summer Universiade
Medalists at the 2020 Summer Olympics
Olympic medalists in table tennis
Olympic bronze medalists for Taiwan
Sportspeople from Tainan
21st-century Taiwanese women